Cachi is a department in the east of Salta Province, Argentina. Its capital is the town of Cachi. The total population was 2,189 as of 2015.

Geography 
Localities and places:
Cachi
 Escalchi
 La Paya
Payogasta
 Rancagua 
 San José de Cachi
 San José de Escalchi

References

External links 
 Cachi Department on Salta Province website

Departments of Salta Province